Viviana Grădinaru (born 1981) is a Romanian-American neuroscientist who is Professor of Neuroscience at the California Institute of Technology. She develops technologies for brain imaging, including optogenetics and CLARITY, to understand reward and sleep. She has been awarded the Presidential Early Career Award for Scientists and Engineers and the National Institutes of Health Director's Pioneer Award. In 2019 she was a finalist for the Blavatnik Awards for Young Scientists. In 2020 she was awarded a Vilcek Prize for Creative Promise in Biomedical Science by the Vilcek Foundation.

Early life and education 
Gradinaru is a native of Vaslui, Romania, and grew up with her grandparents in a small village. As a child, her grandparents and the rest of her community would work together to solve local problems. As a native of Eastern Europe, Gradinaru was encouraged to study science from a young age, and took part in science olympiads. She has said that she benefitted from the many "brilliant women teaching and practicing science in my home country". Gradinaru eventually studied physics at the University of Bucharest. After two years she moved to the California Institute of Technology and graduated in biology in 2005. During her undergraduate studies she became fascinated by neurodegeneration. She moved to Stanford University for her doctoral studies, where she specialised in neuroscience under the supervision of Karl Deisseroth. During her PhD research she taught summer courses at Cold Spring Harbor Laboratory and trained researchers for the Stanford Optogenetics Innovation Laboratory. She took part in ballroom dancing and competed in quickstep at an amateur level throughout graduate school.

Research and career 
In collaboration with her colleagues at Stanford, Gradinaru founded Circuit Therapeutics, serving as the chief technology officer and creating optogenetic therapies to treat people with disorders of the nervous system. Gradinaru joined the faculty at the California Institute of Technology, first as a Visiting Researcher, then Assistant Professor in 2012 and was eventually promoted to full Professor in 2018. Since 2017 she has served as the Principal Investigator of the CLARITY, Optogenetics and Vector Engineering Research (CLOVER) Center at the California Institute of Technology.

Gradinaru has worked on the development of novel technologies for brain imaging, which she uses to understand sleep disorders and movement. These technologies include optogenetics and CLARITY. She developed viral vector screening methods to monitor gene delivery vehicles that can cross the blood–brain barrier. Optogenetics make use of light and photosensitive proteins to manipulate the function of cells that live within heterogenous body tissue.

She looks to use her understanding of neuronal activity to establish the mechanism of action of deep brain stimulation (DBS), as well as looking at the long-term impacts of DBS on neuronal function. In particular she has used optogenetics to study the brain circuitry involved with Parkinson's disease. Using CLARITY Gradinaru looks to create anatomical maps of intact brain networks and biological systems. In 2019 Gradinaru was part of a research team that demonstrated that zebrafish and mice need serotonin to sleep.

Awards and honours 
 2013 World Economic Forum Young Scientist
 2013 Pew Scholar
 2014 Cell's 40 Under 40
 2017 Takeda Pharmaceutical Company – New York Academy of Sciences Innovators in Science Award
 2018 The Gill Center for Biomolecular Science at Indiana University Transformative Investigator Award
 2018 National Institutes of Health Director's Pioneer Award
 2019 Blavatnik Awards for Young Scientists Finalist
2020 Vilcek Prize for Creative Promise in Biomedical Science, Vilcek Foundation

Publications

References 

1981 births
People from Vaslui
Romanian women academics
Romanian women scientists
California Institute of Technology alumni
California Institute of Technology faculty
Romanian neuroscientists
Romanian women neuroscientists
Romanian emigrants to the United States
Living people
Stanford University alumni
University of Bucharest alumni